Eli Colin Snyman (born 25 January 1996) is a Zimbabwean rugby union player for Leicester Tigers in England's Premiership Rugby. His regular position is lock.

Rugby career

2009–2014 : Schoolboy rugby

Snyman was born in Harare, where he attended St. John's Preparatory School. In 2009, he was selected to represent Zimbabwe's Under-13 side in the South African Craven Week competition, starting all four of their matches in Kimberley.

At secondary school level, he attended St. John's College, and was once again selected to represent Zimbabwe at the Craven Week competition for high schools in 2014. He started all three of their matches at the tournament held in Middelburg.

2015 : Blue Bulls Under-19 and Under-21

He was named in the Blue Bulls Under-19 squad that participated in the 2015 Under-19 Provincial Championship, chosen to be vice-captain and started eight of their twelve matches during the regular season of the competition. He scored one try in the competition, in a 42–24 victory over the  team, helping the Blue Bulls to finish in second spot on the log to qualify for the semi-finals. Snyman also made one start and one appearance as a replacement for the  team at the end of the Under-21 Provincial Championship, but rejoined the Under-19 team for the title-ply-offs. While missing out on silverware, he received a personal accolade, being named the Under-19 Forward of the Year at the Blue Bulls' end-of-season awards ceremony.

2016–2019 : Blue Bulls, UP Tuks and South Africa Under-20

At the start of 2016, Snyman linked up with  – the Pretoria-based university side affiliated to the Blue Bulls academy – for the 2016 Varsity Cup competition.

In March 2016, Snyman was included in a South Africa Under-20 training squad, and made the cut to be named in a reduced provisional squad a week later. On 10 May 2016, he was included in the final squad for the 2016 World Rugby Under 20 Championship tournament to be held in Manchester, England. Snyman started all five of their matches in the competition; after a 59–19 come-from-behind victory over Japan in their opening match in Pool C of the tournament, South Africa were beaten 13–19 by Argentina in their second match, but bounced back to secure a 40-31 bonus-point victory over France in their final pool match to secure a semi-final place as the best runner-up in the competition. South Africa then faced three-time champions England in the semi-finals, but the hosts proved too strong for South Africa, knocking them out of the competition with a 39–17 victory. Another loss in their final match – 19–49 to Argentina in the third-place play-off – condemned South Africa to fourth place in the competition.

Snyman was named in Super Rugby side the ' extended training squad for the 2017 season.

2019–2021 Benetton

Snyman joined Italian Pro14 side  for the 2019–20 Pro14 and 2020–21 Pro14 seasons.

2021– Leicester Tigers
It was announced on March 8, 2021 that Snyman would join Leicester Tigers for the 2021-22 season. Snyman made his debut for Leicester on 18 September 2021 as a substitute in a 34-19 win against Exeter Chiefs.

References

External links
 Eli Snyman's Blue Bulls profile
 Eli Snyman's profile on SA Rugby
 Eli Snyman's profile on itsrugby.co.uk
 

1986 births
Living people
Sportspeople from Harare
Alumni of St. John's College (Harare)
Zimbabwean rugby union players
South African rugby union players
South Africa Under-20 international rugby union players
Leicester Tigers players
Rugby union locks